"Charlie Is My Darling" is the title of a number of traditional Scots songs.

The first is attributed variously to James Hogg or Carolina Oliphant (Lady Nairne).  Beginning with the line Twas on a Monday morning, right early in the year, it celebrates the Jacobite movement. A second later song of the same name is attributed to Charles Gray. However, the best-known version is by Robert Burns, whose 1794 version is somewhat more earthy than the more patriotic earlier ones. Eddi Reader has recorded a popular version of this one on her highly regarded CD of Burns' songs.

There is an arrangement by Ludwig van Beethoven, "Charlie is my darling", WoO. 157 (12 songs of various nationalities) no. 3 (1819).

The song was adapted in the American Civil War as 'Johny is my Darling', a variation on Charlie.

Modern adaptations
Roger Quilter's setting of the Burns version of the song was included in the Arnold Book of Old Songs, published in 1950.

The song was also parodied on BBC Radio Scotland, by comedy group Flying Pig Productions in their show Desperate Fishwives. The title was switched to "Darling is a Charlie", referring to the trials and tribulations of the then current (2008–2010) Chancellor of the Exchequer, Alistair Darling.

Another parody of the song is heard in the "Charlie X" episode of the classic series Star Trek, in which Lt. Uhura sings a special version (with lyrics adapted to the plot) as Mr. Spock accompanies her on the Vulcan lyre.

The title was used by the Rolling Stones in their 1966 documentary Charlie Is My Darling.
The lyrics to this song were changed by composer Dimitri Tiomkin and featured in the 1950 movie called "Dakota Lil"; it was given the Jazz treatment and sung by Anita Ellis, who dubbed for actress Marie Windsor, who played the title lead.

The song is also in the educational computer game The Oregon Trail, where it is featured at Soda Springs as the song which plays there, as each location of note has an accompanying song.

References

External links
Burns' version at Wikisource

Scottish songs
Jacobite songs
Adaptations of works by Robert Burns
Scots-language works
Year of song unknown